Ta-Seti (Land of the bow, also Ta Khentit, the Frontier or Borderland) was the first nome (administrative division) of Upper Egypt, one of 42 nomoi in Ancient Egypt. Ta-Seti marked the border area towards Nubia, and the name was also used to refer to Nubia itself.

History
Every nome was ruled by a nomarch (provincial governor), who answered directly to the pharaoh.

The area of the district was about 2 cha-ta (about 5.5 hectare / 4.8 acres; 1 cha-ta equals roughly 2.75 hectare / 2.4 acres) and about 10,5 iteru (about 112 km / 69,6 miles, 1 iteru equals roughly 10,5 km / 6.2 miles) in length.

The Niwt (main city) was Abu / Elephantine (part of modern Aswan) and among other cities were P'aaleq / Philae (modern Philae), Sunet / Syene (modern Aswan) and Pa-Sebek / Omboi (modern Kom Ombo). Every niwt had a Het net (temple) dedicated to the chief deity and a Heqa het (nomarchs residence).

The district's main deity was Horus and among others major deities were Anuket, Arensnuphis, Hathor, Isis, Khnum, Mandulis, Satet and Sobek.
Today the area is part of the Aswan Governorate.

The Prophecy of Neferti, a literary text from the Middle Kingdom of Egypt mention the mother of Amenemhat I, founder of the Twelfth Dynasty, being from the Elephantine Egyptian nome Ta-Seti. Many scholars have argued that Amenemhat I's mother was of Nubian origin.

The identity of the Ta-Seti people has not yet been definitively established. From what is known today, the Ta-Seti are believed to have spoken a Nilo-Saharan language.<ref>Christopher Ehret, The Civilizations of Africa: A History to 1800, University Press of Virginia, 2002.</ref>

Nomarchs of Ta-Seti
The following is a partial genealogy of the nomarchs of Ta-Seti during the 12th Dynasty. The nomarchs are underlined.

References

Helck, Wolfgang; Westendorf, Wolfhart: Lexikon der Ägyptologie''. Wiesbaden: Harrassowitz 1977.

External links
About the nomoi of Egypt
Detailed map of the nomois
Hieroglyphs of the nomoi

Nomes of ancient Egypt